Mykola Andriyovych Horbal (born September 10, 1940) is a well-known Ukrainian dissident, human right activist, member of parliament of Ukraine, poet, and member of the Ukrainian Helsinki Group.

Early life
Mykola Horbal was born on September 10, 1940, in the village of Wołowiec in the Lemkivshchyna region, then administered as part of the General Government (German-occupied Poland), now in Gorlice County, Poland.  In 1947, his family was moved to Ukraine, and they settled in the village of Letyache (Ternopil Oblast).

From 1963 to 1970, Horbal worked as a music teacher.  During this period, he first started creating poetry.

Imprisonment
On November 24, 1970, Horbal was arrested by the KGB and charged with Anti Soviet Agitation and Propaganda. He was sentenced to 5 years imprisonment and 2 years exile in Siberia.

On release from prison and return to Ukraine, Horbal settled in Kyiv, where he joined the Ukrainian Helsinki Group which had formed in 1976. All of the members of the group were arrested, and on October 23, 1979, Horbal was arrested and sentenced to 5 years hard labour.

In 1984, having completed the 5-year term, Horbal was not released from incarceration, but was immediately sentenced to another term of 8 years of hard labour and 3 years in exile. However, this sentence was terminated in 1988 during the Perestroika.

Political career
Upon release, Horbal immediately became active in Ukrainian politics.  He served as a representative to the Kyiv City Council from 1990 to 1994.

He has served as a member of Parliament of Ukraine from 1994 till 1998.

Publications
Horbal's works were first published outside of Ukraine. The first collection of his work was published in the United States in 1983. His first collection was entitled "Details of a Noisy Alarmclock" (Ukrainian: Деталі Піщаного Годинника), and the second publication was of poetry for children, a collection entitled "A Song for Little Andrew" (Ukrainian: Коломийка Для Андрійка).

In 1986, a collection of his poetry was translated into German, and published in the collection "Here the End is Awaited" (Ukrainian: Тут Чекають Кінця).

In 1992, Horbal was awarded the prestigious Vasyl Stus Prize for poetry.

State awards
  (2009)
 The 3rd Class of the Order of Merit (2005)
 The 1st Class of the Order For Courage (2006)

References

1940 births
Living people
People from Gorlice County
Lemkos
Second convocation members of the Verkhovna Rada
Soviet dissidents
Soviet human rights activists
Ukrainian dissidents
Ukrainian human rights activists
Ukrainian Helsinki Group
Chevaliers of the Order of Merit (Ukraine)
Recipients of the Vasyl Stus Prize